Semyon Vladimirovich Poltavskiy (born 8 February 1981 in Odessa, Ukrainian SSR) is a former volleyball player from Russia, who was a member of the men's national team that won the silver medal in both the 2005 and 2007 European Championships. He was named Most Valuable Player in the latter tournament.

Individual awards
2007 World League "Best Scorer"
2007 World League "Best Server"
2007 European Championship "Most Valuable Player"
2007 European Championship "Best Server"
2007 FIVB World Cup "Best Server"

References
 FIVB Profile

1981 births
Living people
Russian men's volleyball players
Volleyball players at the 2008 Summer Olympics
Olympic volleyball players of Russia
Olympic bronze medalists for Russia
Sportspeople from Odesa
Olympic medalists in volleyball
Medalists at the 2008 Summer Olympics